The Women's 200m freestyle at the 2007 Pan American Games occurred at the Maria Lenk Aquatic Park in Rio de Janeiro, Brazil, with the final being swum on July 20.

Medalists

Results

Finals

Preliminaries

References
For the Record, Swimming World Magazine, September 2007 (p. 48+49)

Freestyle, Women's 200m
2007 in women's swimming